Jaime Fillol and Patricio Cornejo, the defending champions, returned with new partners. The pairs met in the quarterfinals with Cornejo and Pat DuPré claiming victory but Gene Mayer and Hank Pfister ended their run in the semifinal. Top-seeded Mayer and Pfister went on to win the title, beating Jeff Borowiak and Chris Lewis in the final.

Seeds
A champion seed is indicated in bold text while text in italics indicates the round in which that seed was eliminated.

Draw

Finals

Top half

Bottom half

References

External links

U.S. Clay Court Championships
1978 U.S. Clay Court Championships